Robert, Count of Eu and Lord of Hastings (d. between 1089-1093), son of William I, Count of Eu, and his wife Lesceline.  Count of Eu and Lord of Hastings.

Robert commanded 60 ships in the fleet supporting the landing of William I of England and the Norman conquest of England. Around 1068, Robert was given the Hastings Castle and the adjacent territories previously owned by Onfroy du Tilleul. According to the Domesday Book, Robert and his son William each possessed lands in separate counties. The sum of the annual income generated by the lands of the two men amounted to about 690 pounds sterling.

In 1069 he was charged by the king to support Robert, Count of Mortain, to monitor the Danes, whose fleet moored in the mouth of the Humber, while the latter was to repress the revolt initiated by Eadric the Wild the west. When the Danes left their sanctuary to plunder the neighbourhood, the two commanders and their army fell upon them unexpectedly, crushing them, and forcing them to flee by sea.

After the death of King William, Robert followed the party of Robert Curthose, Duke of Normandy. Dismayed by his softness and debauchery, he turned, along with several other Norman lords, towards the king William II the Red, from whom he received several garrisons for his castles. During the attempted intervention of the English king in Normandy in February 1091, he was one of his supporters. He died after this episode and his son William II succeeded him as count.

Robert married first Beatrix de Falaise, sister of Arlette de Falaise. Robert and Beatrix had six children:
 Raoul d'Eu (d. after 1036)
 Robert d'Eu (d. 1149)
 Condoha (Condor) (d. after 1087) married in 1058 to Fulk d'Angoulême, and was mother of William V d'Angoulême and grandmother of Wulgrin II d'Angoulême.
 William II, who succeeded his father as Count of Eu and Lord of Hastings
 Eremburga of Mortain (possible), the second wife of Roger i, Count of Sicily.
 Armand of Mortain (possible), married to Beatrix, daughter of Tancred of Hauteville.

Very devout, he made numerous donations to the Church, notably lands at Fécamp Abbey of Rouen in 1051. After being widowed, he remarried, to  Mathilde de Hauteville, daughter of Roger I, Count of Sicily, and Judith of Evreux, a second cousin of William the Conqueror. He repudiated her, however, and in 1080 she was married to Raymond IV of Saint-Gilles, Count of Toulouse and Marquis of Provence.

He was buried in the Abbey of Saint-Michel du Tréport, which he had founded in Tréport, near the town of Eu, between 1057 and 1066, in memory of his first wife. Robert was assisted by the council of Duke William and Maurilius, archbishop of Rouen.

Robert was succeeded as Count of Eu and Lord of Hastings by his son William.

Sources

References

 
Eu